Berta Beeson (February 2, 1899 – September 7, 1969) was the stage name of Herbert "Slats" Beeson, a cross-dressing circus performer known as "The Julian Eltinge of the Wire."

Early life
According to several anecdotes, he learned to dance upon the wire by imitating the routine of a young girl in the circus. Upon her sudden injury, he stepped in to take her place; in one version, the young woman for whom he inadvertently understudied became his wife. As a teenage grocery clerk in Summitville, Indiana, Beeson moonlighted at the local vaudeville house.

Circus career
In 1917, the Sells Floto Circus billed him as "Mademoiselle Beeson, Marvelous High Wire Venus."  During his performance in the center ring, the side rings were clear.  In 1925, following Bird Millman’s retirement from circus life, the Ringling Brothers and Barnum and Bailey Circus featured Beeson as "The Mad-Cap Whirlwind of the Mid-Air".  He retired from performance in 1936, but later reemerged as an advance man, traveling ahead of the show to make necessary arrangements.

Personal life
Beeson died in California at the age of 70, survived by his wife Margaret.

References

1899 births
1969 deaths
American circus performers
American drag queens
Tightrope walkers
Vaudeville performers
20th-century circus performers
20th-century LGBT people